Anthony Schuster (born 22 March 1990) is a French professional footballer who plays as a midfielder for Championnat National 3 club GC Lucciana.

Career
After having played six years at Les Herbiers, Schuster left the club to join Belgian side Tubize in the summer 2017. But ahead of the 2019–20 season, he returned to Les Herbiers.

In August 2021, Schuster signed with Bastia-Borgo.

References

External links
Anthony Schuster profile at foot-national.com

1990 births
Living people
Footballers from Marseille
French footballers
Association football midfielders
Les Herbiers VF players
Toulouse FC players
Montauban FCTG players
A.F.C. Tubize players
FC Bastia-Borgo players
Ligue 2 players
Championnat National players
Championnat National 2 players
Championnat National 3 players
Challenger Pro League players
French expatriate footballers
French expatriate sportspeople in Belgium
Expatriate footballers in Belgium